Balti may refer to:

Places
 Bălți, a city in Moldova
 Bălți County (Moldova), a former county of Moldova
 Bălți County (Romania), a former county of Romania
 Balti Power Plant, one of two Narva Power Plants in Estonia
 Bălți Steppe, a grassland in northern Moldova
 Balti Triangle, an area of Birmingham, England
 Balti jaam (Baltic station), Tallinn railway station

People
 Balti, Latin for the Balts
 Bianca Balti, an Italian model
Balti (singer) (born 1980), Tunisian singer, rapper, composer and music producer

Other uses
 Balti (food), a northern Pakistan-style food believed to originate from the UK
 Balti dynasty, a branch of the ancient Visigoths
 Balti language spoken in Baltistan and Ladakh in Kashmir
 Balti people, an ethnic group of Tibetan origin in Baltistan

See also
Baltistan, a mountainous region in Gilgit-Baltistan, Pakistan-administered Kashmir
Baltic (disambiguation)
Balta (disambiguation)

Language and nationality disambiguation pages